Wolves in Wolves was a public art exhibition which took place in Wolverhampton, England, between 5 July and 24 September 2017.

The event consisted of 30 two-metre-high wolf sculptures that were located throughout Wolverhampton. The wolves were individually decorated by local and international artists, with sponsorship funding provided by public and private sector organisations. The wolves formed a 4.5 mile Wolf Trail taking in West Park, Chapel Ash and Wolverhampton city centre, with a map available to help people track them down. Wolves in Wolves was Wolverhampton's largest public art event ever to this date. Additionally, there was an exhibition of 70 mini-wolves sculptures, designed and painted by pupils from 35 primary schools, community groups and artists, on display at Wolverhampton Art Gallery for the duration of the event.

The ambition for Wolves in Wolves was to combine a quality artistic and cultural event with associated public health, educational and economic benefits as well as raising funds and awareness for key local organisations and charities.

The event
Wolves in Wolves was a joint project between City of Wolverhampton Council, Outside Centre and Wolverhampton Business Improvement District (BID).

In May 2016, Outside Centre commissioned Boho Creative to design the prototype wolf sculpture, which formed the basis of each exhibit.  In March 2017, the first blank wolf sculpture was delivered to Moreton School  situated in the Bushbury Hill area of the city, with the school pupils tasked with creating a design for the Mayoral Wolf; a wolf sculpture designed with the Mayor of Wolverhampton in mind. A further 29 blank sculptures were delivered to a studio, where local and international artists decorated each wolf sculpture in a unique manner.

The 30 wolves were strategically exhibited along a "Wolf Trail"  which wound through the city centre. At the same time City of Wolverhampton Art Gallery hosted an exhibition of over 70 miniature wolf sculptures which had been decorated by primary schools in the city and by local artists funded by Celebrate of the Big Lottery. Over 100,000 people visited the city to take part in the Wolf Trail walks over the summer of 2017, visit a pop-up shop selling branded "Wolves in Wolves" merchandise as well as items created by the artists who participated in the project.

The project was supported by several organisations in the city and region, who were categorised as Platinum, Gold or Silver sponsors (and other special project element supporters). These were HeadStart Wolverhampton, Hilton Main Construction, Learn Play Foundation, Mander Centre, Marston’s Wolverhampton Civic and Historical Society, MoveCorp, Talent Match Black Country, NHS Wolverhampton Clinical Commissioning Group, Wolverhampton Speedway, University of Wolverhampton, Yoo Recruit, West Midlands Fire Service, Wolverhampton Wanderers FC, Arena Theatre and Enjoy Wolverhampton (Wolverhampton BID), Awards for All, and the Heritage Lottery Fund.

Conclusion of the event
At the conclusion of the event, some sponsors retained their wolf sculptures, which may still be seen in the City of Wolverhampton today.  However, many of the Wolves in Wolves exhibits were sold at a public auction at Wolverhampton Wanderers Molineux stadium on 2 November 2017.

More than 150 people attended the auction led by Fielding Auctioneers Ltd’s Will Farmer, who is well known for his appearances on BBC’s Antiques Roadshow. There were also online bids as 15 of the 2-metre-high wolves, and 40 of the mini-wolves, went under the hammer in the Hayward Suite Wolverhampton Wanderers Molineux stadium.

‘Garden’ (by the artist Claire Rollerson) was the big wolf that went for the most money at £3,200, while the most expensive of the 40 mini-wolves was Ralph (by the artist Meg Gregory) at £1,000. The final sale proceeds of over £35,000 were divided between Outside Centre and the Charities of the Mayor of the City of Wolverhampton.

The Mayor of the City of Wolverhampton, Cllr Elias Mattu, Chief Executive of Outside Centre, Dr Paul Darke, and Wolverhampton BID Director, Cherry Shine, all made speeches and entertainment was provided by Dicky Dodd of Signal 107.

List of wolf statues
30 wolf sculptures, each uniquely designed by local and international artists, are situated in and around Wolverhampton city centre. The majority of these are outdoors, with some in art galleries and theatres.

References

External links
 Official Wolves in Wolves website
 http://enjoywolverhampton.com/bid/

Painted statue public art
Sculptures in England